The giant antshrike (Batara cinerea) is a species of bird in the family Thamnophilidae, belonging to the monotypic genus Batara. It is found in the southern Yungas, western Paraguay and the southern Atlantic Forest. This is the largest species of antbird, measuring 34 cm long and weighing around 150 g.

Its natural habitats are subtropical or tropical moist lowland forest, subtropical or tropical moist montane forest, and heavily degraded former forest.

The giant antshrike was described by the French ornithologist Louis Vieillot in 1819 and given the binomial name Thamnphilus cinerea (misspelled as Tamnphilus). The current genus Batara was introduced by the French naturalist René Lesson in 1831.

References

External links
Image at ADW

giant antshrike
Birds of the Atlantic Forest
Birds of Paraguay
Birds of the Yungas
giant antshrike
Taxa named by Louis Jean Pierre Vieillot
Taxonomy articles created by Polbot